João dos Santos (Évora – Goa, 1622) was a Portuguese Dominican missionary in India and Africa.

Life

On 13 August 1586, four months after leaving Lisbon, Santos arrived in Portuguese Mozambique. He was at once sent to Sofala, where he remained four years with Father João Madeira. Between them they baptized some 1694 natives and had built three chapels when they were ordered back to Mozambique.

After a journey of hardships they were forced to remain on the Zambesi River, Santos staying at Tete for eight months. From registers found there he discovered that the Dominicans had baptized about 20,000 natives before the year 1591 at Tete alone.

From Mozambique he was sent to the small island of Querimba, where he remained for two years. The registers here gave the information that 16,000 natives had been baptized before the year 1593. Next he was appointed commissary of the Bulla da Cruzada at Sofala, where he stayed more than a year.

His labors in Africa ended on 22 August 1597, when he left Mozambique for Portuguese India. With the exception of eleven years spent in Europe (1606–17) he lived the rest of his life in India.

Works
His book Ethiopia Oriental is a description of the Portuguese colonization of Africa at the end of the sixteenth century. He gives an account of the manners and customs of the Bantu tribes at that date; he was a keen observer, and generally a sober narrator of things that he saw.

References
 The entry cites:
Ethiopia Oriental (Lisbon, 1891)
Theal, The Portuguese in South Africa (Cape Town, 1896)

1622 deaths
Portuguese Dominicans
Portuguese Roman Catholic missionaries
Year of birth unknown
People from Évora
16th-century Portuguese people
17th-century Portuguese people
Dominican missionaries
Roman Catholic missionaries in Mozambique
Roman Catholic missionaries in India